Not Enough Night is the sole album by indie rock band, Kubichek!. It was released in the UK on 19 March 2007. The title is taken from the chorus of the song Nightjoy.

Track listing
"Searchers" - 0:22
"Roman Is Better" - 3:15
"Taxi" - 2:49
"Nightjoy" - 3:28
"Hope Is Impossible" - 4:53
"Stutter" - 3:21
"Method Acting" - 3:36
"Outwards" - 3:10
"Opening Shot" - 2:57
"Hometown Strategies" - 3:30
"Start As We Meant To" - 5:00
"Just Shut It Down" - 3:17
"A Dead End" - 3:31 (Japan-only bonus track)

2007 albums
Albums produced by Dave Eringa